Macusani District is one of ten districts of the Carabaya Province in Peru. Its seat is Macusani.

Geography 
The Kallawaya mountain range lies northeast of Macusani. Other mountains are listed below:

Ethnic groups 
The people in the district are mainly indigenous citizens of Quechua descent. Quechua is the language which the majority of the population (70.66%) learnt to speak in childhood, 28.51% of the residents started speaking using the Spanish language (2007 Peru Census).

See also 
 Chawpiqucha
 Parinaquta

References